Canada is a popular destination for international students across all levels of its education system, with the country ranking fourth in terms of international student enrollment as of 2019, following the United States, United Kingdom, and China.

According to the International Education Strategy published by the Government of Canada, international students are present in all levels of education, including primary, secondary, trades, and college and  post-secondary education, with the largest number of international students enrolled at the post-secondary level. The number of enrolled students has been increasing steadily in all levels from 2015 to 2018, with the greatest rise in college attendance. The International Education Strategy for the period 2019-2024 includes a commitment to diversify inbound student population and distribute them more evenly across the country rather than  concentration them in a few cities.To attract more international students, many Canadian universities are working to attract international students by providing English as a second language programs and reserving specific scholarships for international students of high caliber.

A survey conducted by the Canadian Bureau for International Education (CBIE) found that 96% of  international students endorsed Canada as a study destination, due to its quality education and its reputation as a safe, tolerant and multicultural country that celebrates diversity.

Statistics

Number of students 

Figures for the international student population in Canada vary depending on the reporting agency. Immigration, Refugees and Citizenship Canada (IRCC) only reports on the number of students with a valid work or study permit. Students who study for less than six months do not require a permit, which means that short-term students are not counted in IRCC statistics. The International Education Division of Global Affairs Canada (GAC) includes both short- and long-term students in their statistics, basing short-term numbers on data obtained from Languages Canada. By definition, this means that GAC numbers will be higher than those reported by IRCC.

The IRCC reports that , there were a total of 642,480 international students in Canada at all levels, representing a 13% increase from the previous year. Most international students are post-secondary students, with over 120,000 of college student permit holders reported in 2018 and most recent statistic released by the GAC is for 2018, reporting 721,000 students.

Most international students are post-secondary students. In 2015, the number of college students was reported at approximately 50,000 and by 2018 the number was over 120,000 college student permit holders.

In addition to post-secondary education, Canadian high schools and primary schools also attract increasing numbers of international students. In 2000, the GAC reported that there were 27,997 international students at the primary and secondary level. By 2010, this number had increased to 35,140. In 2017, CIBE, relying on IRCC numbers, reported 71,350 international students in the secondary and primary Canadian school systems.

The provinces with the highest international student populations are Ontario and British Columbia. In 2016, Ontario had the greatest number of international students in Canada, with 233,226 short- and long-term students representing 44.5% of all international students in the country. British Columbia had 145,691 students, representing 27.8% of the international student population. Quebec, Alberta, and Nova Scotia had the next three largest populations of international students.

By university 

According to Maclean's, in 2016, the three universities with the highest enrollment of international students in first-year undergraduate studies were the University of British Columbia (31%), McGill University, (30.7%), and Bishop's University (29.6%). For graduate students overall, the universities with highest international enrollment were the University of Windsor (57.2%), Memorial University of Newfoundland (50%), and Concordia University (49.2%).

Demographics 
International students attending Canadian institutions are primarily coming from Asia. IRCC statistics for 2018 show that over 50% of all international students come from just two countries - India, with 172,625, represents about 30% of enrollments, and China, with 142,895, represents about 25%. South Korea (24,195), France (22,745), and Vietnam (20,330), send the next-greatest number of students.

Work and residency 
Students are able to work off-campus 20 hours a week during the regular school year and engage in full-time employment during scheduled breaks on the strength of their study permit. After graduation, students wishing to remain in Canada may apply for a Post-Graduation Work Permit, lasting three years - and subsequently for a Permanent Residency Pathway. Part of their Core 1 responsibility in the Immigration, Refugees and Citizenship Canada Departmental Plan 2019-2020 is an intention to work with all partners to better understand options for immigration for international students in a "study to immigration" initiative.

In recent year there has been considerable concern about how well international graduates are faring during their post graduation work permit phase. Not only is there evidence on hand which suggests very low volumes of these graduates are successful in their goal of transitioning from international student to Permanent Residence, but also that the vast majority of international graduates working on post graduate work permit are stuck working in low skilled low paying jobs.

Economic impact of students 
The large number of international students studying in Canada contributes significantly to the Canadian economy. According to Global Affairs Canada, the economic impact can be felt across the entire country. In 2015, expenditures by international students, including tourism associated with visitors to the students, was worth $12.8 billion; in 2016, that figure had increased by 21.2% to $15.5 billion. Long-term international students spent an estimated yearly average of $33,800 in 2015 and $35,100 in 2016. This figure includes expenses associated with education, as well as unrelated discretionary spending, but excludes money spent by visiting family and friends. In 2015, international education created or supported 140,010 jobs (118,640 full-time equivalent), and in 2016, that increased to approximately 168,860 jobs (143,150 FTE).

International student spending in Ontario contributed $5.04 billion to the provincial gross domestic product in 2015; this figure increased to $6.35 billion in 2016. The expenditures of international students supported 62,737 jobs in 2015, and 79,034 jobs in 2016. British Columbia also experienced an increase in their GDP from $2.39 billion in 2015 up to $2.76 in 2016. Over the same period, jobs supported by foreign enrollment in British Columbia increased from 35,294 to 40,499.

Consumer Protection Concerns and Ethical Concerns 
As the number of international students in Canada increase, serious ethical concerns have begun to emerge related to the conditions international students face as well as the international student recruitment process, which to date remains unregulated.

The concerns began to appear in the Canadian media in September 2019 when the Toronto Star, in collaboration with the St Catharine's Standard, published a four part investigative series called "The Price of Admission". A full length investigative piece published by the Walrus Magazine, provided an in depth descriptions of the potential for exploitation Canada's international students face. Consumer protection concerns and concerns related to program integrity of Canada's International study program and unregulated international student recruitment have also been covered by the Globe and Mail and other news sources. There have also been a number of media reports that outline an increasing problem with international students committing suicide.

A concern has been that the expectations marketed by overseas unregulated education agents who are recruiting the students for colleges and universities in Canada may create false expectations. Education agents typically earn a 15%-20% tuition commission for sending students successfully to a partner institution in many cases the student recruit is fully unaware of this commission. In many cases these agents use aggregator platforms that enable them to earn commissions for placements even when they do not have a direct recruitment contract with the Canadian designated learning institution they are performing recruitment functions for. This has raised some concerns, due to the fact aggregator recruitment platforms do not allow the respective designated learning institutions in Canada to control the messaging or business practices of the education agents who are performing recruitment functions on the ground.

In what is suspected to be part of a human smuggling operation, on January 19, 2022, the bodies of four people (all Indian nationals) — two adults, a teen and an infant, believed to be a family — were found on the Canadian side of the U.S.-Canada border near Emerson, Manitoba. At least one of the individuals is known to have entered Canada on a student visa. Some evidence exists that this may be part of a much larger human smuggling operation focused on illegal trafficking of temporary residents from Canada to the United States of America. In 2006, the Canadian Border Service Agency published a report called “Student Fraud in the Pacific Region” a report which highlighted the CBSA’s uncovering of several hundred cases of alleged fraud within the International Student Program (ISP). "Students" uncovered in the investigation were linked to organized criminal activities such as prostitution, drug trafficking and gun smuggling. CBSA concluded that student-related fraud poses risks to the immigration program’s integrity, and to public safety and national security.

Escalating tensions between Indian international students and Indian Canadians 
The notable growth in international students from India has led to escalated tensions with Canada's large Indian Canadian community, who claim that students are "stealing their jobs" and "causing violence" within the established Indian enclaves of the country.

Incidents

References

External links
Study in Canada as an international student at Immigration, Refugees and Citizenship Canada

Student exchange
Study abroad programs
Student migration
International education industry
Education in Canada
Economy of Canada